Christine M. Warnke is a senior vice president at Capitol Hill Consulting Group in Washington, D.C., and a local talk show host. She is an at-large member of the District of Columbia Democratic State Committee. Previously, she was a lawyer at Hogan Lovells.

Early years and education 
Warnke graduated from the University of Maryland, College Park in 1975. She earned a doctoral degree at UMD in 1993. In 2005, she was awarded the university's Outstanding Alumnus Award.

Political career
From 1996 to 1998, she chaired the D.C. Commission for Women and was reappointed by Mayor Anthony A. Williams in 2002. She was one of Mayor Adrian Fenty's four appointments to the D.C. Humanities Council. In April 2014, Warnke was elected to a city-wide DC Democratic State Committee position.

In 2012 Warnke was appointed chair of the White House Project to advance Women's Leadership in Washington DC.

Awards and recognition

1994 Confirmed by Senate as member of the board of directors of the National Institute of Building Sciences
1999 Ellis Island Medal of Honor
2004 Opportunities Industrialization Centers International, Leon Sullivan Outstanding Achievement Award 
2002 Daughters of Penelope, Women of the Year Award
2005 University of Maryland Distinguished Alumnus award, Public Health & Human Performance 
2009 Gusi Peace Prize Laureate in Economics and Humanitarianism 
2013 Tuskegee Airmen Award during the Presidential Inauguration of 2013

Active association positions
December 2014 Commissioner for the Real Estate Commission of the District of Columbia 
Founding President of the Hellenic American Women's Council
Board member of the National Museum of African Art
Board member for Friend of the Children of Angola and Human Trafficking Foundation
Board Member of Airline Ambassadors International
Advisory Board member of the Euclid Financial Group
Member at large committeewoman

References

Politicians from Washington, D.C.
University of Maryland, College Park alumni
Year of birth missing (living people)
Living people
People associated with Hogan Lovells